Roswell Gray Ham (March 11, 1891 – July 20, 1983) was an American educator who served as the 12th President of Mount Holyoke College from 1937 to 1957. He was born in LeMoore, California and received his B.A. from University of California, Berkeley and his Ph.D. from Yale University. He taught at Yale for ten years before becoming the first male president of Mount Holyoke.

See also
Presidents of Mount Holyoke College

References

External links
Man to Mount Holyoke - TIME, 15 June 1936
Biography

1891 births
1983 deaths
Mount Holyoke College faculty
Presidents and Principals of Mount Holyoke College
University of California, Berkeley alumni
Yale University alumni
People from Lemoore, California
Yale University faculty
20th-century American academics